Stenocercus lache is a species of lizard of the Tropiduridae family. It is found in Colombia.

References

Stenocercus
Reptiles described in 1983
Endemic fauna of Colombia
Reptiles of Colombia